A Woman Like You is a 1933 German comedy film directed by Carl Boese and starring Liane Haid, Georg Alexander, and S. Z. Sakall.

The film's sets were designed by the art director Ludwig Reiber. It was shot at the Bavaria Studios in Munich and on location in Garmisch-Partenkirchen.

Cast

References

Bibliography

External links 
 

1933 films
1933 comedy films
German comedy films
Films of Nazi Germany
1930s German-language films
Films directed by Carl Boese
Bavaria Film films
Films shot at Bavaria Studios
German black-and-white films
1930s German films